Charmodia is a monotypic moth genus of the family Erebidae. Its only species, Charmodia vectis, is known from Suriname, Panama and Costa Rica. Both the genus and the species were first described by Heinrich Benno Möschler in 1883.

References

Herminiinae
Monotypic moth genera